The 44th edition of the World Allround Speed Skating Championships for Women took place on 19 and 20 February 1983 in Karl-Marx-Stadt at the Eisschnelllaufbahn ice rink.

Title holder was Karin Enke from East Germany.

This was the first world championship for women using the big combination of 500m, 3000m, 1500m and 5000m distances. The 1000m distance was replaced with 5000m. This was the only occasion that this championship was ever held in East Germany

Distance medalists

Classification

Source:

References

Attribution
In Dutch

1980s in speed skating
1980s in women's speed skating
1983 World Allround
1983 in women's speed skating